Casbah des Ait Maouine is a town in central-western Mauritania. It is located in the Chinguetti Department in the Adrar Region.

Nearby towns and villages include Tentane (40.4 nm), Chinguetti (48.1 nm), Ksar el Khali (86.5 nm), Ouadane (86.5 nm), Ksar el Barka (75.2 nm) and Rachid (62.4 nm) .

External links
Satellite map at Maplandia.com

Populated places in Mauritania
Adrar Region